The 1880 international cricket season was from April 1880 to September 1880. The season consisted of a single international tour, visiting Australia in England for one-off series which was won by England. In the match, W. G. Grace scored England's first ever Test century. Also his brothers E. M. Grace and Fred Grace provided the first instance of three brothers playing the same Test.

Season overview

July

Australia in England

References

International cricket competitions by season
1880 in cricket